Uuno (Kalervo) Klami (20 September 1900, Virolahti – 29 May 1961, Virolahti) was a Finnish composer of the modern period. He is widely recognized as one of the most significant Finnish composers to emerge from the generation that followed Jean Sibelius.

He was born in Virolahti. Many of his works are related to the Kalevala. He was influenced by French and Spanish music, and especially by Maurice Ravel, for whom he had a particular esteem.

The core of Klami's oeuvre consists of an assortment of works related to the Finnish national epic, the Kalevala, among the most notable being: the five-movement Kalevala sarja (Kalevala Suite; 1933, r. 1943), inspired by Stravinsky's The Rite of Spring; the symphonic poem, Lemminkäisen seikkailut saaressa (Lemminkäinen’s Island Adventures; 1934); and, the unfinished ballet, Pyörteitä (Whirls), which survives as two suites. As central to Klami's legacy is the six-movement orchestral suite, Merikuvia (Sea Pictures; 1932); the Karelian Rhapsody (1927); and, Psalmus (1936), an oratorio for soloists, mixed, chorus and orchestra. He also wrote two numbered symphonies, in 1938 and 1945, respectively, as well as two piano concerti (1925, 1950), a Violin Concerto (1943), and the Cheremissian Fantasy for cello and orchestra (1931).

He participated in five armed conflicts, including two wars in Karelia, the Finnish Civil War, the Winter War of 1939–40 and  the Continuation War of 1941–44.

Biography

Klami studied music in Helsinki with Erkki Melartin and later in Paris and Vienna. Klami's Karelian Rhapsody, part of his first composition concert in 1928, was a succès de scandale that brought him considerable attention. His main works include the Kalevala Suite and the unfinished ballet Whirls. The oratorio Psalmus (1936) has a unique place in Finnish sacred music and is one of the most highly regarded works by a Finn other than Jean Sibelius. Klami also experimented with the symphonic form in his two Symphonies (1938 and 1945) and Symphonie enfantine (1927), and the concerto form in his two Piano Concertos (No. 1 Une nuit à Montmartre and No. 2 for Piano and Strings) and the Violin Concerto (1943). Being a master of miniature orchestral works, the orchestral suite Sea Pictures is also regarded as one of his major achievements. On the recommendation of Sibelius he was granted a small lifetime income from the government. In 1959 he was made a member of the Finnish Academy of Science and Letters (one of Finland's highest honors).

Klami died of a heart attack in Virolahti at age 60 while sailing his favorite boat "Miina".

Legacy

Reception and recordings 

Acclaimed during his lifetime, Klami is today seldom heard outside the Nordic countries, the Kalevala Suite perhaps excepted.

The recording boom in the 1990s saw all of Klami's major works made available to the public, albeit often in only one interpretation per composition.

Despite these projects, much of Klami's  remains unrecorded (and unpublished), and he has received considerably less attention from record labels relative to fellow Finnish composers such as Leevi Madetoja, Aulis Sallinen, and Joonas Kokkonen.

Memorials 
Founded in 1987, the Helsinki-based Uuno Klami Society exists to recognize the composer and to promote the publication, academic study, and performance of his music. At its first general meeting on 16 May 1988, the musicologist Helena Tyrväinen was elected chair; she held this post for 22 years until 2010. In addition, every five years, the Kymi Sinfonietta and the cities of Kotka and Kouvola (each located in the Kymenlaakso region of southern Finland in which Klami was born) co-host the International Uuno Klami Composition Competition, the goal of which is to increase international recognition of Klami and his music while expanding the repertoire of contemporary European works for a sinfonietta-sized orchestra. The inaugural event was held 2003–04, with subsequent iterations in 2008–09 (II), 2013–14 (III), and 2018–19 (IV). The Kymi Sinfonietta performs short-listed compositions at a finals concert and a jury (chaired by the Finnish composer Kalevi Aho) awards the three main prizes. There is also an audience prize and awards by the participating municipalities.

Honors and titles 
 1925: Diploma, the Helsinki Music Institute
 1927: Composition prize of 3,000 marks, Hjalmar Pesonen Fund
 1928: Grant of 10,000 marks, the Alfred Kordelin Foundation
 1929: Grant of 10,000 marks, the Kordelin Foundation
 1929–32: Music teacher, Folk Conservatory
 1930: Music critic, Iltalehti and Ajan sana
 1931: Music critic, Uusi Suomi
 1932–59: Music critic, Helsingin sanomat
 1932: Grant of 8,000, the Kordelin Foundation
 1933: Grant of 12,000, the Kordelin Foundation
 1935: Grant of 20,000 marks (from whom?)
 1937: Grant of 15,000 marks (from whom?)
 1938: Associate member, the Kalevala Society
 1939–43: Annual State grant of 12,000 marks per year
 1944: Grant of 150,000 marks, the Finnish Cultural Foundation
 1945–47: Member, Society of Finnish Composers
 1946: Grant of 50,000 marks, the Society of Finnish Composers' Sibelius Fund
 1949: Founding member, the Finnish Contemporary Music Society
 1950: Grant of 100,000 marks, the Sibelius Fund
 1952: Grant of 100,000 marks, the Sibelius Fund
 1957: Member, the Finnish delegation to the Second Assembly of the Composers' Union of the USSR
 1958–61: Member of the Board, the Society of Finnish Composers
 1959–61: Member, the Academy of Finland
 1961: First Vice-chairman, the Kalevala Society

Select list of compositions

Symphonies 
 Symphonie enfantine (Children's Symphony), for chamber orchestra, Op. 17 (1928); three movements
 Symphony No. 1, for orchestra (1937–38); four movements
 Symphony No. 2, for orchestra, Op. 35 (1945); four movements

Concertante 
 Piano Concerto No. 1,  (Night in Montmartre), for piano and orchestra , Op. 8 (1925); three movements
 Tšeremissiläinen fantasia (Cheremissian Fantasy), for cello and orchestra, Op. 19 (1931); two movements
 Introduction e Staccato etude, for trumpet and chamber orchestra (1931–32)
 Esquisse, for violin and strings (1932)
 Intermezzo, for cor anglais and chamber orchestra (1937)
 Violin Concerto, for violin and orchestra, Op. 32 (1939–43; rewritten 1954); three movements
 Piano Concerto No. 2, for piano and strings, Op. 41 (1950); three movements
  (Theme with Seven Variations and Coda), for cello and orchestra, Op. 44 (1953–54)

Music for stage 
  (Desire Under the Elms), incidental music for clarinet, trumpet, violin, and piano (1930); play by Eugene O'Neill
 Arranged in 1931 by Klami as Rag-time and Blues, a quintet for the above instruments plus an additional violin
  (The Prodigal Son), incidental music for male voice, choir, flute, clarinet, piano and strings (1945); play by Marin Držić (translation to Finnish by Jalo Kalima)
 Pyörteitä (Whirls), unfinished ballet ("symbolic dance scenes") in three acts based on the Sampo legend from The Kalevala (1957–61): 
 Act I survives as a piano score by Klami (1958; orchestral score believed lost); it was orchestrated by the Finnish composer Kalevi Aho in the late 1980s and premiered in 1988
 Act II (intended as a divertissement) is the only of the three acts that survives in Klami's orchestration; in 1960, he excerpted two ballet suites 
 Act III is either lost or was never written

Voice and orchestra 
 Psalmus, oratorio in two parts for soprano, baritone, mixed choir, organ, and orchestra (1932–36); text by Juhana Cajanus
  (In the Belly of Vipunen), symphonic poem (?) for baritone, male choir, and orchestra (1938); text from The Kalevala
  (Song of Lake Kuujärvi), ballad for baritone and orchestra (1956); text by Yrjö Jylhä 
  (The Bearer of the Golden Staff), cantata in four parts for soprano, baritone, mixed choir, and orchestra (1960–61); text by Martti Haavio

Suites for orchestra 
  (Scenes from a Puppet Theatre), suite for chamber orchestra (orchestrated in 1931; the original 1925 theatre score for two pianos is lost); five movements
 Hommage à Haendel (Homage to Handel), suite for piano and strings, Op. 21 (1931); four movements
  (Scenes from a Country Life), suite for chamber orchestra (1932); six movements
 Merikuvia (Sea Pictures), suite for orchestra (1930–32); six movements
 Kalevala-sarja (Kalevala Suite), five tone pictures for orchestra, Op. 23 (1930–33; No. 3 added in 1943); based on stories from The Kalevala; five (originally four) movements
  (Suite for String Orchestra) (1937); four movements
  (Suite for Small Orchestra), Op. 37 (1946); three movements

Other works for orchestra 
  (Karelian Rhapsody), for orchestra, Op. 15 (1927)
Opernredoute, concert waltz for orchestra, Op. 20 (1929)
  (Joyful Serenades), for chamber orchestra (1933); four movements
Helsinki March (1934)
 Lemminkäisen seikkailut saaressa (Lemminkäinen's Island Adventures), symphonic poem for orchestra (1934); based on The Kalevala; Klami's first attempt at composing a central scherzo for the Kalevala Suite, later removed and made an independent work 
  (Karelian Dances), for chamber orchestra (1935)
  (The Cobbler on the Heath), concert overture for orchestra (1936); based on the play by Aleksis Kivi 
 Suomenlinna, concert overture for orchestra, Op. 30 (1939–40; rewritten 1944); inspired by the islands; later renamed  (The Fortress on the Sea)
  (Spanish Serenades), for chamber orchestra (1944); four movements
  (King Lear), concert overture for orchestra, Op. 33 (1944–45); unrelated to the stage music (chamber ensemble, 1936–37) of the same name
  (The Cyclist), rondo for orchestra (1946)
  (A Karelian Market), for orchestra, Op. 39 (1947)
  ( or Northern Lights), fantasy for orchestra, Op. 38 (1946–48); inspired by the natural light display
All'ouvertura, concert overture for orchestra, Op. 43 (1951)

Chamber 
 Sonata in B minor, for viola and piano, Op. 6 (1920)

Notes, references, and sources

Notes

References

Sources

Sources
 Aho, Kalevi & Valkonen, Marjo: Uuno Klami: Elämä ja teokset. Werner Söderström Osakeyhtiö, Helsinki, 1999. 
 
 Korhonen, Kimmo: "Inventing Finnish Music." Finnish Music Information Centre 2003.
 Lehtonen, Tiina-Maija: "Uuno Klami: Works." Suomen Kultuurirahaston Kymenlaakson rahasto 1986.
 Tyrväinen, Helena: "The Success Story of the Man Who Forged the Sampo." Finnish Music Quarterly 2/2000 pp. 2–11.

Liner notes

Further reading
 Tyrväinen, Helena: Kohti Kalevala-sarjaa: Identiteetti, eklektisyys ja Ranskan jälki Uuno Klamin musiikissa. (Dissertation.) Acta Musicologica Fennica, 30. University of Helsinki, 2013. . . 978-951-98479-9-3 On-line version.

External links

Uuno Klami Society's main page (in Finnish)
International Uuno Klami Composition Competition

1900 births
1961 deaths
People from Virolahti
People from Viipuri Province (Grand Duchy of Finland)
Finnish classical composers
20th-century classical composers
People of the Finnish Civil War (White side)
Finnish military personnel of World War II
Finnish male classical composers
Burials at Hietaniemi Cemetery
20th-century male musicians
20th-century Finnish composers